Mark Eugene Suppelsa (born June 25, 1962 in Milwaukee, Wisconsin) is a retired journalist, who worked as an anchor and investigative reporter for WGN-TV in Chicago, Illinois. Suppelsa served as the co-anchor of the "WGN Evening News" from 5–7 p.m. and the station's long-running primetime newscast "WGN News at Nine" following "WGN News at Ten" with Micah Materre. Suppelsa's last broadcast was December 8, 2017.

Early life and education 
Born in Milwaukee, Suppelsa moved with his family to Libertyville, Illinois in 1972, and then moved to Frankfort, Illinois in 1978.  He graduated from Lincoln-Way High School in New Lenox, Illinois in 1980, according to an article in the Chicago Tribune that appeared on September 26, 1993.  Suppelsa graduated from Marquette University with a degree in journalism in 1984.  He also had worked as a disc jockey and newsman for the campus radio station WMUR and was a news reporter and anchor for Marquette University television.  He also did Marquette basketball play-by-play for the campus TV station as well.

"I enjoyed the story," Suppelsa told the Chicago Tribune in an article that ran on June 29, 1997.  "And something just hooked me.  The deadlines, the writing, the video, the shooting it, the editing it.  It all just swept me away."

During Suppelsa's final year of college, he worked over the holidays at WAOW-TV in Wausau, Wisconsin.

Professional career 
Suppelsa's first job out of college was at WFRV-TV in Green Bay, Wisconsin, where he became an anchor after six months on the job.  In 1987, Suppelsa took a job at KSTP-TV in Minneapolis-Saint Paul, where he worked as an anchor and a reporter.

In July 1993, Suppelsa joined WMAQ-TV in Chicago as a weekend anchor and reporter.  He later became a late afternoon and early evening news anchor. In May 1997, Suppelsa memorably sparred with talk-show host Jerry Springer during WMAQ's 10 p.m. newscast, shortly after Springer resigned after a brief, controversial run as a commentator.

In March 2003, Suppelsa quit WMAQ-TV to join WFLD-TV in Chicago as a reporter, fill-in anchor and investigative reporter.  In September 2004, WFLD promoted Suppelsa to be the co-anchor of WFLD's Fox News Chicago at Nine in Chicago, at the same time demoting Walter Jacobson from the co-anchor position.

On March 10, 2008, Suppelsa chose not to renew his contract with WFLD-TV.  Suppelsa reportedly turned down a contract offer from Channel 32 that would have cut his salary by about 15 percent.  Once the 90-day "right to match" clause in Suppelsa's old contract expired, he became free to announce a new job in TV. He signed a contract deal with WGN-TV to anchor the 9 pm news replacing Steve Sanders (who now anchors the midday newscast from 11 a.m. to 1 p.m.) Sanders replaced Tom Negovan, who became a full-time general assignment reporter and back-up anchor for all WGN newscasts.

Suppelsa also formerly worked as a morning news anchor on the Eric and Kathy Show on WTMX-FM radio in Chicago.  He says it was truly one of the most enjoyable highlights of his working time in Chicago...except for the 4:25am alarm clock each morning.  He says, he quit the radio show in October 2010 because it was simply too many duties to handle in a day after he convinced WGN-TV to hire away his prized investigative producer to work on stories for television.

On December 8, 2017, Suppelsa retired from WGN ending his 39-year career in the news business. He stated his reason for retiring was that he wanted to spend more time with his family. On February 13, 2018, it was announced that Joe Donlon of NBC-affiliate KGW would succeed Suppelsa on the WGN evening news.

Personal 
Suppelsa met his wife, Candus, while working in Minneapolis in 1988, according to a Chicago Tribune article that appeared on June 29, 1997.  Today, Mark and Candus live in Evanston, Illinois with their two children.  Suppelsa also is a vegetarian, according to an article in the Chicago Sun-Times on September 7, 2004.

Suppelsa is a Facebook and Twitter user and is usually logged on during broadcasts.  He frequently updates his status and chat with fans and friends while on the air.

On May 4, 2012, Suppelsa announced that he would be taking a break from his job at WGN to enter a monthlong alcohol rehabilitation program.

References

External links 
 Mark Suppelsa's bio on WGN-TV.com

Television anchors from Chicago
Living people
1962 births
American television reporters and correspondents
People from Milwaukee
Marquette University alumni
People from Libertyville, Illinois
People from Frankfort, Illinois